Bur Malek (also Romanized as Būr Malek and Būr Molk; also known as Barmluk, Bār Molūk, Barmul’k, Būrī Molk, and Pūr Malek) is a village in Bakrabad Rural District, in the Central District of Varzaqan County, East Azerbaijan Province, Iran. At the 2006 census, its population was 84, in 21 families.

References 

Towns and villages in Varzaqan County